The Beach Haven Historic District is a historic district in Beach Haven, Ocean County, New Jersey. The district was added to the National Register of Historic Places on July 14, 1983 for its significance in architecture and history as a beach-front resort during the 19th century. The district boundary was increased on November 19, 2014. It now includes 149 contributing buildings.

Gallery of contributing properties

References

External links
 

Beach Haven, New Jersey
National Register of Historic Places in Ocean County, New Jersey
Historic districts on the National Register of Historic Places in New Jersey
New Jersey Register of Historic Places
Gothic Revival architecture in New Jersey
Queen Anne architecture in New Jersey
Shingle Style architecture in New Jersey